Moving Target may refer to:

Music
Moving Target (Gil Scott-Heron album), 1982
Moving Target (Royal Hunt album), 1995
Moving Target (Simon Townshend album), 1985, or the title track

Films
Moving Target (1988 American film), a made-for-TV film starring Jason Bateman
Moving Target (1988 Italian film), an Italian thriller film starring Ernest Borgnine
Moving Target (1997 film), an American film starring Michael Dudikoff and Billy Dee Williams
Moving Target (2000 film), an American-Irish action film
Moving Target (2011 film), a British thriller
Bersaglio mobile, a 1967 Italian spy film released internationally as Death on the Run and Moving Target

Writings
A Moving Target, a 1982 collection of essays and lectures by William Golding
The Moving Target, a 1949 mystery novel by Ross Macdonald, the first in a series about private investigator Lew Archer
Moving Target, a 2001 novel by Ann Maxwell under the pen name Elizabeth Lowell
Moving Target, UK and Australia title of the 2004 Vatta's War novel Marque and Reprisal by Elizabeth Moon
Moving Target: A Princess Leia Adventure, a 2015 novel - see Journey to Star Wars

Games
Moving Target, a darts game
Moving Target, a video game by Players Premier Software

See also
 Moving Targets (disambiguation)
 Running target shooting